KSYL (970 AM) is an American radio station broadcasting a News Talk Information format. Licensed to Alexandria, Louisiana, United States, the station is currently owned by Cenla Broadcasting.  Its studios and transmitter are located separately in Alexandria.

The station was founded by the late Sylvan Robert Fox, not the Sylvan Fox associated with Newsday, a newspaper on Long Island. The KSYL callsign was inspired by Fox's first name.

References

External links

Radio stations in Louisiana
News and talk radio stations in the United States
Radio stations established in 1962
Mass media in Alexandria, Louisiana
1962 establishments in Louisiana